Olivia Jaimes is a pseudonymous American cartoonist who began writing and illustrating the long-running daily comic strip Nancy in 2018, updating it for a modern audience.

Nancy

Jaimes began producing the Nancy comic strip in 2018, following the retirement of Guy Gilchrist after a 22-year run. Her first strip appeared on April 9, 2018.  Jaimes' art style was visually distinct from that of Gilchrist. In particular, Jaimes drew Aunt Fritzi less like her original pin-up-style design, instead depicting her in a style similar to the other characters in the strip. She also modernized the setting, with frequent references to current trends and technologies, such as smartphones, social media, ear buds, and a robotics club.

While some fans of Gilchrist's run were not pleased with the changes, most professional criticism was positive. Social engagement on the comic strip's page increased 500 percent compared with the end of Gilchrist's run.

Jaimes' Labor Day 2018 strip, which included a panel of Nancy riding a hoverboard with two smartphones and a selfie stick, and announcing that "Sluggo is lit," became an internet meme, with the phrase inserted into other comic book panels and other images.

Awards

2018

For her first year, Olivia Jaimes' Nancy was recognized in numerous "year's best" awards including:

 Tech Crunch, Favorite Things of 2018
 The Ringer, Year in Review, Best Comic Strip The Hollywood Reporter, The Best Comics of 2018 AV Club, Best Comics of 2018 Paste Magazine, 25 Best Comic Books of 2018 (Honorable Mention)2019

 The Mike Wieringo Comic Book Industry Awards (Ringo Awards), Best Comic Strip or Panel''

References

External links
 Lambiek Comiclopedia biography.

21st-century American artists
Living people
American female comics artists
Pseudonymous artists
Year of birth missing (living people)
21st-century American women artists